Center is a city in Shelby County, Texas. The population was 5,221 at the 2020 U.S. census. It is the county seat of Shelby County located in deep East Texas.  It was named for its location near the center of Shelby County, it is near the Louisiana border.

Geography

Demographics

As of the 2020 United States census, there were 5,221 people, 1,713 households, and 1,266 families residing in the city.

As of the census of 2000, there were 5,678 people, 2,034 households, and 1,334 families residing in the city. The racial makeup of the city was 51.14% White, 34.22% African American, 0.23% Native American, 0.46% Asian, 10.95% from other races, and 2.99% from two or more races. Hispanic or Latino of any race were 18.05% of the population.

There were 2,034 households, out of which 32.2% had children under the age of 18 living with them, 41.1% were married couples living together, 20.3% had a female householder with no husband present, and 34.4% were non-families. 30.8% of all households were made up of individuals, and 17.2% had someone living alone who was 65 years of age or older. The average household size was 2.61 and the average family size was 3.23.

In the city, the population was spread out, with 26.3% under the age of 18, 10.9% from 18 to 24, 25.0% from 25 to 44, 18.8% from 45 to 64, and 19.0% who were 65 years of age or older. The median age was 36 years. For every 100 females, there were 86.8 males. For every 100 females age 18 and over, there were 82.4 males.

The median income for a household in the city was $26,061, and the median income for a family was $31,699. Males had a median income of $23,468 versus $19,441 for females. The per capita income for the city was $14,233. About 19.4% of families and 23.7% of the population were below the poverty line, including 31.5% of those under age 18 and 14.7% of those age 65 or over.

History
Shelby County was one of the original 13 counties in Texas, being organized by the Republic of Texas Congress in 1837. The county was named for Issac Shelby, an American military hero and governor of Kentucky. Shelby County eventually became one of the most populous and prosperous counties in the state because of its proximity to Louisiana and location along the Sabine River.

The settlement which eventually became the City of Center was originally called White Cottage. A post office was established at this settlement on April 6, 1848.

Al Johnson, an East Texas State Representative, introduced a bill to have all county seats be as close to the center of the county as possible. R.L. Parker, the County Clerk at the time, arranged to have the county surveyed and the center located. However, one night in 1866, a group of men led by Parker entered into the court house and stole all of the records and took them to a log cabin near White Cottage. Shortly after the incident, the community became known as Center, primarily to reflect the requisite location of the county seat.

The Center post office opened in October 1866. In 1869, Confederate veterans Captain Jesse Amason and James C. Wilson, with wife Margaret Davis Wilson, each donated  of land for the townsite of Center. According to one historical account, Amason would not give the land unless the new town would have a  town square, and that is the reason that Center has such a large square. Mr. Wilson owned considerable land in the southern quarter of the town. Much of that area is called the "Wilson Addition".

On the night of May 31, 1882, a fire erupted at the courthouse and the building was a complete loss. The county contracted with J.J. E. Gibson, an Irish immigrant, to construct a new courthouse and jail. When the bond of builders J.J. E. Gibson and Pat McLaughlin for the sum of $26,725 was issued in 1884 for them to erect a new courthouse for Shelby County, the firm of Wilson and Martin was among the securities. The courthouse, modeled after an Irish castle, was completed in November, 1885 and is still standing as the centerpiece of the Center Square.

The town of Center made national news twice in 1920s for the lynchings of black murder suspects without a trial.  On August 3, 1920, Lige Daniels was seized by an angry mob that broke into the Shelby County Jail, where he was being held on charges of the beating death of a woman.  Daniels, an 18-year old black man, was dragged out and hanged from a tree in front of the courthouse, famous as the "Center Hanging Oak".  The oak tree was used again as a gallows on May 21, 1928, when another mob intercepted another 18-year old African-American, accused murderer Eolis Evans, as he was being returned to the county jail.  The "hanging oak" tree itself died in 1990 and was cut down.

At noon on February 12, 1950, an F3 tornado touched down in Center, destroying several buildings. The tornado killed three and injured at least 15 people.

Employers
Some of the city's major employers include:

Brookshire Brothers – a regional grocery company founded and headquartered in Lufkin, Texas
Farmers State Bank – financial institution offering checking, savings and loans; seven locations, headquartered in Center, Texas
Hallmark – Center Fixture Operations is one of two U.S. fixture production plants supporting Hallmark Cards, Inc. The plant processes fixture orders and manufactures Hallmark's product display concepts found in retail stores.
Panola College – community college
Portacool, LLC – Portacool, LLC is the worldwide manufacturing leader in the portable evaporative cooling industry providing cooling solutions that protect against heat stress and discomfort in hard-to-cool spaces. The company is dedicated to worksite safety, productivity, sustainability and social responsibility by providing a variety of cooling products when comfort counts. Headquartered in Center, Texas, since 1990, Portacool products are made in the US with domestic and global parts. 
Shelby Savings Bank – financial institution offering checking, savings, loans and insurance; six locations, headquartered in Center, Texas
Stephen F. Austin State University – state university (located in Nacogdoches; some employees reside in Center)
Tyson Foods – Tyson Foods, Inc. is an American multinational corporation based in Springdale, Arkansas, that operates in the food industry. The company is the world's second largest processor and marketer of chicken, beef, and pork. The center, Texas, operation is a chicken processing facility.

Events
The city celebrates a county wide Watermelon Festival in July and the East Texas Poultry Festival in October each year. The poultry festival is accompanied by the Poultry Festival Pageant in which high school Juniors of the county participate. The Pageant crowns a Poultry Festival Queen who presides over the three-day Poultry Festival. The festival is in honor of John Moosberg who started the broiler house system in Shelby County. A mural of the events is located in the Farmers State Bank with John Mooseberg's picture. The Queen is decided by a board of non-partisan, appointed judges. The annual What A Melon Festival also crowns a queen to reign over the festival in July each year.

Also in Shelby County there is the Miss Shelby County Pageant. The Pageant is open to all Shelby County Young Ladies and a PreTeen, JrTeen, Teen and Miss Queen is crowned. The title holder represents Shelby County throughout her annual reign at many area events.
Also each fall, in August, junior girls from Shelby County high schools compete against each other in the Poultry festival pageant the winner wins a $2,000 scholarship.

Media
The Light and Champion, a news and information company, marked its 140th year of operation in 2017. Based in Center, it serves Shelby County, as well as Logansport, Louisiana. The Light and Champion produces a weekly print edition, a weekly free-distribution print product called The Merchandiser. The Light and Champion is owned by Moser Community Media, based in Brenham, Texas.

Notable people
 Charlie Bradshaw, professional football player
 John Campbell, blues guitarist
 Wayne Christian, Texas State Representative
 Dan Duncan, oil tycoon, billionaire, and philanthropist
 Cade Foehner, 4th place contestant in the 16th season of American Idol
 Bryan Hitt, drummer for REO Speedwagon
 Charles McClelland, Houston Police Department
 Charles Ray, U.S. diplomat
 John S. Redditt, Texas politician and businessman
 Del Shofner, professional football player, MVP of 1957 Sugar Bowl

Outlying communities 
 Aiken
 Spann's Chapel
 Mt. Herman
 Jericho
 Short
 James
 Folsom Chapel
 Dreka
 Neuville

Government and infrastructure
The City of Center was incorporated in 1893, however, this incorporation was dissolved and the city was reincorporated by means of another charter in 1901. The city developed and adopted a new home rule charter on April 7, 1984. The City of Center operates under the home rule charter with a council-manager form of government. The governing body, the Center City Council, is composed of a mayor, two council members elected "at-large" by citywide elections and four members elected from single member districts. The mayor and council members serve staggered two year terms. The mayor and council are responsible for casting a vision and direction for the city, enacting legislation in the form of ordinances and resolutions, adopting and amending budgets, making appointments to the different boards and commissions and determining the policies of the city.
The United States Postal Service operates the Center Post Office.

Education
The City of Center is served by the Center Independent School District.

Climate
The climate in this area is characterized by hot, humid summers and generally mild to cool winters. According to the Köppen Climate Classification system, Center has a humid subtropical climate, abbreviated "Cfa" on climate maps.

See also

 Impact of the COVID-19 pandemic on the meat industry in the United States

References

External links

 The Official Website of Center, Texas
 The Official Website of Shelby County, Texas
 The Official Website of Center Independent School District
 'Center, Texas' Entry at The Handbook of Texas Online
 ShelbyCountyToday.com

Cities in Texas
Cities in Shelby County, Texas
County seats in Texas